Brodie Dupont (born February 17, 1987) is a retired Canadian professional ice hockey forward and current coach. He is the head coach of UK Elite Ice Hockey League (EIHL) side Cardiff Devils. He was drafted in the 3rd round, 66th overall by the New York Rangers in the 2005 NHL Entry Draft.

Playing career
After playing in the American Hockey League (AHL) with the Hartford Wolfpack for more than three seasons, Dupont was first called up to the New York Rangers on January 19, 2011 and made his NHL debut on January 22, playing seven shifts during a 3–2 shoot-out win over the Atlanta Thrashers.

On July 2, 2011, he was traded by the Rangers to the Nashville Predators for Andreas Thuresson.

After parts of three seasons abroad with German club, Iserlohn Roosters of the Deutsche Eishockey Liga, Dupont returned to North America in initially signing with ECHL club, the Norfolk Admirals. As captain of the club in the 2016–17 season, Dupont was the leading point scorer with 41 in 40 games before he was signed to a professional tryout (PTO) contract with AHL affiliate, the Bakersfield Condors. After concluding the regular season with 21 games with Bakersfield, his ECHL rights were traded to the Greenville Swamp Rabbits, with whom he played 2 post-season games.

As a free agent in the following off-season, Dupont returned to the Norfolk Admirals, securing a one-year deal on September 21, 2017. Regaining his role as team captain through the 2017–18 season, Dupont led the club in scoring at a point-per game rate through 68 appearances. He also had a one-game PTO stint with the Stockton Heat of the AHL.

On July 9, 2018, Dupont left the Admirals for a second time, agreeing to a one-year contract with the Austrian club, Dornbirn Bulldogs of the Austrian Hockey League (EBEL).

Later years and coaching career

After two years in Denmark with Herning Blue Fox, Dupont agreed terms with UK EIHL side Cardiff Devils for the 2021-22 season - joining as player/assistant coach.

In April 2022, Dupont - alongside Cardiff assistant coach Neil Francis - took interim charge until the end of the season following the departure of head coach Jarrod Skalde. Dupont then led Cardiff to the 2022 Elite League play-off championship with a 6-3 win over Belfast Giants in the final.

In May 2022, Cardiff confirmed the appointment of Dupont as their permanent head coach. As a result, Dupont retired from playing.

Personal
Dupont was born in Russell, Manitoba, but grew up in St. Lazare, Manitoba. On July 6, 2013, Brodie Dupont married Kayleen Kelly. Brody now resides with Kayleen and his two children in the town of Hampton, New Brunswick, Canada.

Career statistics

Regular season and playoffs

International

See also
List of players who played only one game in the NHL

References

External links

1987 births
Living people
Bakersfield Condors players
Calgary Hitmen players
Canadian ice hockey centres
Cardiff Devils players
Connecticut Whale (AHL) players
Dornbirn Bulldogs players
Greenville Swamp Rabbits players
Hartford Wolf Pack players
Herning Blue Fox players
HC Valpellice players
Ice hockey people from Manitoba
Iserlohn Roosters players
Milwaukee Admirals players
New York Rangers draft picks
New York Rangers players
Norfolk Admirals (ECHL) players
Stockton Heat players
Swan Valley Stampeders players
Canadian expatriate ice hockey players in Italy
Canadian expatriate ice hockey players in Germany
Canadian ice hockey coaches
Canadian expatriate ice hockey players in Wales
Canadian expatriate ice hockey players in Austria
Canadian expatriate ice hockey players in the United States